Maurys Charón (born 25 January 1965) is a Cuban weightlifter. He competed in the men's heavyweight II event at the 1992 Summer Olympics.

References

1965 births
Living people
Cuban male weightlifters
Olympic weightlifters of Cuba
Weightlifters at the 1992 Summer Olympics
Central American and Caribbean Games medalists in weightlifting
Place of birth missing (living people)
20th-century Cuban people
21st-century Cuban people